Le Barp is a municipality in the Southwest of France that has 5410 inhabitants (April 2018). It is located in the Department of Gironde in the Region of Nouvelle-Aquitaine. It is also located in the Landes Forest, on the territory of the Landes de Gascogne Regional Nature Park. 
Le Barp has a special geographic situation because it is located between Bordeaux and Arcachon Bay which are two highly tourist destinations. 
The inhabitants are called the «Barpais».

Population

As of 2019, there are 5,605 inhabitants in Le Barp.

Geography 
Le Barp is located on the territory of the Landes de Gascogne Regional Nature Park, near the Val de l'Eyre. The adjacent municipalities of Le Barp are Cestas in the North, Saucats in the North East, Saint-Magne in the South East, Belin-Béliet In the South, Salles in the South West and Mios in the West. Le Barp is also located on the D1010 national road and close to the A63 motorway.

History 
The town was founded around the hospital that already existed in the thirteenth century instead of the current church and which did not survive the abandonment of the pilgrimage. Le Barp is on the way from Tours to Santiago de Compostela and many pilgrims go through Le Barp every year. It is a part of its history. This former hospital was an important stop for pilgrims. 
To the Revolution, the Saint-Jacques parish formed the commune of Le Barp.

Economy

Agriculture 
Most of the primary activity is oriented towards the exploitation of the forest that covers a large part of the municipal territory.
The company Planasa (Darbonne Pépinière) produces strawberries and small red fruits and also exports and markets plants.
Le Barp is famous for its production of Sables des Landes asparagus and its cooking recipes.

Industry 
The Aquitaine Scientific and Technical Design Centre (CESTA) of the French Alternative Energies and Atomic Energy Commission is located in the north of the municipal territory.

Local culture and heritage

Places and monuments 

The Saint-Jacques Church was completely rebuilt during the second part of the 19th century. It has a bell tower dating from the 18th century.

Le Barp, situated on the territory of the Landes de Gascogne Regional Park, participates in the Contemporary Art Forest Project (Forêt d'Art Contemporain in French). It hosts a contemporary work of art like several other neighbouring municipalities.

See also
Communes of the Gironde department
Parc naturel régional des Landes de Gascogne

References

Communes of Gironde